Presidential, legislative and local elections were held on November 10, 1953 in the Philippines. Incumbent President Elpidio Quirino lost his opportunity to get a second full term as President of the Philippines to former Defense Secretary Ramon Magsaysay. His running mate, Senator Jose Yulo lost to Senator Carlos P. Garcia. Vice President Fernando Lopez did not run for re-election. This was the first time that an elected president did not come from the Senate. This election also saw the involvement of the United States with the Central Intelligence Agency (CIA) with agent Edward Lansdale running Magsaysay's campaign. Other candidates competed for CIA support too and many normal Filipinos were interested in what the United States citizens views were on it.

Results

President

Vice-President

Senate

House of Representatives

See also
Commission on Elections
Politics of the Philippines
Philippine elections
President of the Philippines
3rd Congress of the Philippines

References

External links
 Official website of the Commission on Elections

1953
General election